Harold William "Baldy" Cotton (November 5, 1902 – September 9, 1984) was a Canadian professional ice hockey player who played 12 seasons in the National Hockey League for the Pittsburgh Pirates, Toronto Maple Leafs and New York Americans.

Playing career
Cotton's hockey career began in Pittsburgh after moving there to attend Duquesne University. In 1925, he began playing for the Pittsburgh Yellow Jackets of the United States Amateur Hockey Association while attending school. He would later sign with the NHL's Pittsburgh Pirates, playing with the club for parts of 4 seasons. He was traded to the Toronto Maple Leafs in the middle of the 1928–29 season and would record a career high 38 points the following year in his first full season with Toronto. Cotton won his only Stanley Cup playing for the Maple Leafs in 1931–32. In 1935, Cotton was sold to the New York Americans where he played for two more seasons until his retirement in 1937.

Front office
After playing professional hockey, Cotton served as a scout for the Boston Bruins and Minnesota North Stars, retiring from hockey permanently in 1977.

Awards and achievements
1931–32 - Stanley Cup Champion - Toronto Maple Leafs
1933–34 - Played in Ace Bailey Benefit Game

Transactions
Signed as a free agent by the Pittsburgh Pirates, September 26, 1925.
Traded by the Pittsburgh Pirates to the Toronto Maple Leafs for Gerry Lowrey and $9,500, February 12, 1929.
Sold by the Toronto Maple Leafs to the NY Americans for cash, October 9, 1935.

Career statistics

Regular season and playoffs

External links
Biography & stats - Legends of Hockey

1902 births
1984 deaths
Boston Bruins scouts
Canadian ice hockey forwards
Duquesne University alumni
Ice hockey people from Ontario
Minnesota North Stars scouts
New York Americans players
Pittsburgh Pirates (NHL) players
Pittsburgh Yellow Jackets (USAHA) players
Sportspeople from Haldimand County
Stanley Cup champions
Toronto Maple Leafs players